Fukuiraptor ("thief of Fukui") was a medium-sized megaraptoran theropod dinosaur of the Early Cretaceous epoch (either Barremian or Aptian) that lived in what is now Japan. Fukuiraptor is known from the Kitadani Formation and possibly also the Sebayashi Formation.

Description and history 

The type specimen is a partial skeleton (designated FPDM-V97122) discovered in the Kitadani quarry near Katsuyama in the Fukui prefecture. It is thought that this specimen was not mature and an adult may have been larger. The remains of many other individuals have been found in the quarry, with numerous humeri, femurs, and teeth being assigned to this species. However, the other individuals recovered from the same locality are mostly juveniles that were smaller than the holotype (Currie & Azuma, 2006), in the smallest case less than a quarter of the holotype's size. A tooth (NDC-P0001) discovered in a block of conglomerate from the Sebayashi Formation has been referred to Fukuiraptor as well. As indicated by its slender phalanges, Fukuiraptor was a relatively lightly built animal, regardless of its maturity. In 2010 Gregory Paul gave a length of 5 meters (16 ft) and a weight of 300 kg (660 lbs). Molina-Pérez and Larramendi estimated a length of 4.3 meters (14.1 ft) and a weight of 590 kg (1,300 lbs) in 2016.

The distinctive teeth of Fukuiraptor show similarities with both carcharodontosaurids (being very compressed and blade-like, as well as having wrinkled enamel) and tyrannosaurids (having oblique blood grooves near the serrations). The holotype also had very large and flat manual unguals (hand claws), which played a role in its initial classification as a dromaeosaurid (as the hand claws were mistaken for foot claws) as well as its current classification as a megaraptoran.

Classification 
Initially considered a member of the Dromaeosauridae when first discovered, its initial describers considered it a carnosaur, related to Allosaurus. More recent studies consider it a megaraptoran, an enigmatic group which may have been part of the family Neovenatoridae. However, more recently, another analysis has proposed that all megaraptorans are actually tyrannosauroids, which would reclassify Fukuiraptor as a tyrannosauroid coelurosaur. Recent cladistic analysis of the theropod Gualicho has suggested that Fukuiraptor and other megaraptorans are either allosauroids, or non-tyrannosauroid basal coelurosaurs.

Below is a cladogram reconstructing the position of Fukuiraptor in the Megaraptora as per Delcourt and Grillo, 2018.

It has been suggested that Fukuiraptor is a close relative to the Australian Megaraptoran known as Australovenator, however some studies place Australovenator as a derived Megaraptoran which actually forms a clade with the South American Megaraptorans known as Megaraptoridae.

Palaeoecology 

In the Kitadani Formation, where fossils of Fukuiraptor have been recovered, fossils of other vertebrates have been preserved. Among the species that have been properly described and named are Fukuisaurus tetoriensis, a styracostern ornithischian, Fukuititan nipponensis, a titanosauriform sauropod, Koshisaurus katsuyama,  a hadrosauroid ornithischian, Fukuivenator paradoxus, a maniraptoriform theropod, and Fukuipteryx prima, an avialan as defined by the authors.

External links

 Image of the holotype skeleton, published by the twitter account of Thomas Holtz

References

Early Cretaceous dinosaurs of Asia
Extinct animals of Japan
Fossils of Japan
Megaraptorans
Taxa named by Philip J. Currie
Fossil taxa described in 2000
Aptian life
Barremian life